The Kazakh famine of 1919–1922, also referred to as the Turkestan famine of 1919–1922, was a period of mass starvation and drought that took place in the Kirghiz ASSR  (present-day Kazakhstan) and Turkestan ASSR as a result of the Russian Civil War, in which 400,000 to 750,000 peasants died. The event was part of the greater Russian famine of 1921–22 that affected other parts of the USSR, in which up to 5,000,000 people died in total.

Background
The famine was caused by severe intermittent drought conditions, aggravated by the Russian Civil War and the policy of Prodrazvyorstka adopted by the Soviet government.

Famine
By 1919, roughly half of the population was starving. Epidemics of typhus and malaria were also widespread. The greatest percentage of losses of the Kazakh population was in Aktyubinsk, Akmola, Kustanai and Ural provinces. According to the estimates of demographers, about 19% of the population died, which is equivalent to 400,000 people. However, Turar Ryskulov, chairman of the Central Electoral Committee of the Turkestan Autonomous Soviet Socialist Republic, estimated that "about one third of the population must have died", which is equivalent to 750,000 people.

Relief
The Soviet government invited international organizations such as Workers International Relief to provide relief and the American government provided aid to starving Kazakhs from 1920 to 1923 through the American Relief Administration. 1923 and 1924 were turning points in the restoration of the national economy and the hardest hitting phase of the famine ended in 1922. However, shortages, starvation, and illness continued throughout 1923 and into 1924.

See also
1921–1922 famine in Tatarstan
Kazakh famine of 1932–1933

References

Sources

Further reading
Mustafa Shokay, "Туркестан под властью Советов. К характеристике диктатуры пролетариата", Paris, 1935, excerpts published in Prostor, 1992.N9-10.C.101-112
Мусаев, Бауыржан Алпысбаевич; Голод в первой половине 20-х годов ХХ века в Казахстане: исторический, социально-политический анализ,  Ph.D. thesis, Uralsk, 2005

Famines in the Soviet Union
1920s in the Kazakh Autonomous Socialist Soviet Republic
20th-century disasters in Kazakhstan
20th-century famines
Persecution of Kazakhs